Fredrick 'Fred' J. Love (born in Little Rock, Arkansas) is an American politician and a Democratic member of the Arkansas Senate. Love previously served in the Arkansas House of Representatives from 2013 to 2023.

Education
Love earned his bachelor's degree in political science and his master's degree in public administration from the University of Arkansas at Little Rock and a postbaccalaureate certificate in public health at the UAMS Medical Center. He was taught high school English by former state senator Joyce Elliott.

Elections
2012 Redistricted to District 29, and with Republican Representative Ann Clemmer redistricted to District 23, Love was unopposed for both the May 22, 2012 Democratic Primary and the November 6, 2012 General election.
2004 When District 35 Representative Jim Lendall left the Legislature and left the seat open, Love ran in the three-way 2004 Democratic Primary, but lost to Pam Adcock, who was unopposed for the November 2, 2004 General election.
2010 When Representative Adcock left the Legislature and left the seat open, Love won the May 18, 2010 Democratic Primary with 1,299 votes (58.0%), and won the November 2, 2010 General election with 3,995 votes (81.8%) against Independent candidate Rick Daes.

References

External links
Official page  at the Arkansas House of Representatives
Campaign site 

Fredrick Love at Ballotpedia
Frederick (Fred) Love at the National Institute on Money in State Politics
Fredrick Love 2004 candidacy

21st-century African-American politicians
21st-century American politicians
African-American state legislators in Arkansas
Living people
Democratic Party members of the Arkansas House of Representatives
Politicians from Little Rock, Arkansas
University of Arkansas at Little Rock alumni
Year of birth missing (living people)